opened in Yūsui, Kagoshima Prefecture, Japan, in 2000. Located in the foothills of Mount Kirishima, at an elevation of seven hundred metres above sea level, the Museum encompasses an area of 20 hectares. Works are displayed in the open air as well as in the Art Hall.

See also
 Kirishima-Yaku National Park

References

External links
  Kirishima Open Air Museum
  Collection
  Kirishima Open Air Museum

Museums in Kagoshima Prefecture
Yūsui, Kagoshima
Art museums and galleries in Japan
Open-air museums in Japan
Art museums established in 2000
2000 establishments in Japan